The Tobacco and Primary Medical Services (Scotland) Act 2010 is an Act of the Scottish Parliament. It bans the open display of tobacco products in shops and bans the use of cigarette vending machines. The Act established the Scottish Tobacco Retailers Register.

The Act introduced stronger measures against shops who sell tobacco to people under 18. The legal age to carry tobacco products in Scotland is 16. If a police officer suspects that someone under 16 is in possession of cigarettes, tobacco or cigarette papers in a public place then they can confiscate the items.

See also 
 Smoking in the United Kingdom

References

External links

Acts of the Scottish Parliament 2010
Retailing in Scotland
Scottish criminal law
Smoking in the United Kingdom
Vending machines
Government databases
Databases in Scotland